Masab Tank is an anglicized version of Maa-Sahiba Tank. Maa-Sahiba was a title endowed on Hayat Bakshi Begum, wife of Qutub Shahi VI. The ‘Talab’ or tank was built by Khanum Agha, Qutub Shah V's mother, but it became famous after his wife as ‘Talab-e-Maa-Sahiba’. The upgraded ‘Maa Sahiba Talab’ got anglicized to Masab Tank.

The modern Masab Tank is a major locality in Hyderabad, India. The area lies at the junction of Road#1, Banjara Hills and the road connecting Humayun Nagar and Lakdi Ka Pul.

The JNTU College of Fine Arts is located there. The old JNTU campus is still located beside the JNTU College of Fine Arts.Government Polytechnic, Hyderabad is one of the most famous polytechnics of Telangana and Andhra Pradesh is situated in masab tank. according to the State Board of Technical Education and Training (SBTET)
, the Masab Tank Government Polytechnic is the number one ranking polytechnic across the states of Telangana and Andhra Pradesh. The 10-story Income Tax Towers house the income tax department. The office houses Chief Commissioners of Income Tax, important IRS officers.

Commercial area
Masab Tank has malls and shopping areas. Hyderabad Business centre is located there.

Transport
TSRTC runs the buses connecting it to all parts of the city.

The closest MMTS Train station is at Lakdi Ka Pul.

References

Neighbourhoods in Hyderabad, India